The Mayor of New Brunswick is head of the executive branch of the government of New Brunswick, New Jersey.

References

New Brunswick